Rochebaron is a soft blue cheese made from pasteurised cow's milk, in the town of Beauzac in the Auvergne region, in the Massif Central, France.

This cheese is one of several that are made by curdling milk and separating the curds from the whey. Pressed into moulds, Rochebaron is then pierced with wires impregnated with Penicillium glaucum to produce blue veins through the soft whitish body of the cheese. The crust of edible ashes is dark matte grey.

See also
List of cheeses
List of French cheeses

References
 

French cheeses
Occitan cheeses